The 2019 Trofeo de Campeones de la Superliga Argentina was the 1st edition of the Trofeo de Campeones de la Superliga Argentina, an annual football match contested by the winners of the Argentine Primera División and Copa de la Superliga competitions.

It was played on 14 December 2019 at the Estadio José María Minella in Mar del Plata between Racing and Tigre. Racing and Tigre qualified after winning the 2018–19 Argentine Primera División tournament and the 2019 Copa de la Superliga, respectively.

Racing defeated Tigre 2–0 to win their first title.

Qualified teams

Match

Details

Statistics

References 

2019 in Argentine football
Racing Club matches
Club Atlético Tigre matches
Football in Buenos Aires Province